Provócame (Turn Me On) is the sixth studio album recorded by Puerto Rican performer Chayanne. The album was released by CBS Columbia on August 14, 1992 (see 1992 in music).

Track listing

Chart performance

Sales and certifications

References

1992 albums
Chayanne albums
Spanish-language albums
CBS Discos albums